Still Kicking: Six Artistic Women of Project Arts & Longevity is a 2006 32-minute documentary film by Pacific Grove filmmaker Greg Young, featuring six Bay Area women role models over 85 years old who remained artistically active. The catalyst for Young's film was Amy Gorman and Frances Kandl's Project Arts & Longevity through which they were exploring the link between longevity and artistic vitality. Along with the film the joint project resulted in a book entitled Aging Artfully.

Still Kicking's first festival screening was at the 2006 Real to Reel Film Festival in North Carolina. The film was also selected for screening by the 2006 Independents' Film Festival, the 2006 Port Townsend Film Festival, the 2007 Missouri International Film Festival, and the 2007 Santa Barbara International Film Festival.

In 2003 Young produced his first documentary called "Do You Know Yellowlegs is a Storytelling Museum?" on the Oakland storyteller Orunamamu, known for her flamboyant attire which included yellow "psychedelic spandex leggings" Gorman had interviewed Orunamamu as part of the Project and the film caught their attention. When the three met, Young asked if he could document their process.

Citations

References 
 Foreword by Robert A. Johnson

External links 
Still Kicking Official Site

2006 films
American documentary films
Documentary films about the arts
Documentary films about old age
Documentary films about women
History of women in California
2000s English-language films
2000s American films